The knock-out stage of the 2013 CAF Confederation Cup was played from 6 October to 30 November 2013. A total of four teams competed in the knock-out stage.

Qualified teams
The winners and runners-up of each of the two groups in the group stage qualified for the knock-out stage.

Format
Knock-out ties were played on a home-and-away two-legged basis. If the sides were level on aggregate after the second leg, the away goals rule was applied, and if still level, the tie proceeded directly to a penalty shoot-out (no extra time was played).

Schedule
The schedule of each round was as follows.

Semi-finals
In the semi-finals, the group A winners played the group B runners-up, and the group B winners played the group A runners-up, with the group winners hosting the second leg.

|}

CS Sfaxien won 1–0 on aggregate and advanced to the final.

TP Mazembe won 3–1 on aggregate and advanced to the final.

Final

In the final, the order of legs was decided by a draw. The draw was held on 14 May 2013, 14:00 UTC+2, at the CAF Headquarters in Cairo, Egypt.

|}

CS Sfaxien won 3–2 on aggregate.

References

External links

3